The following article presents a summary of the 1912 football (soccer) season in Brazil, the 11th season of competitive football in the country.

Campeonato Paulista

Final Standings

Americano-SP declared as the Campeonato Paulista champions.

State championship champions

References

 Brazilian competitions at RSSSF

 
Seasons in Brazilian football
Brazil